Olga Kalyuzhnaya (born 19 December 1982) is a Russian former tennis player.

She entered the 2003 Hyderabad Open but lost in the qualifying round finals to Zheng Jie. In 2002, she played in the main draw of the Tashkent Open but retired in round two due to injury.

ITF circuit finals

Singles: 7 (3–4)

Doubles: 3 (0–3)

References

External links
 
 

1982 births
Living people
Russian female tennis players
20th-century Russian women
21st-century Russian women